Ptilotus R.Br. is a genus of approximately 120 species of annual and perennial herbs and shrubs in the family Amaranthaceae. All species are native to mainland Australia, although one species, Ptilotus spathulatus (R.Br.) Poir., also occurs in Tasmania and another, Ptilotus conicus R.Br., in Malesia on the islands of Flores and Timor. Most of the diversity is in Western Australia, particularly in the Pilbara. Common names for species in this genus include mulla mulla, foxtails, pussy tails and lamb's tails. The genus was first formally described by botanist Robert Brown in Prodromus Florae Novae Hollandiae in 1810. In family-level phylogenetic studies, Ptilotus has been placed within a clade informally known as the 'aervoids'. It has been resolved as monophyletic and is closely related to Aerva Forssk. An interactive key to the species of Ptilotus is available at KeyBase.

Species

Conservation status 
A number of Ptilotus species are listed as threatened or priority flora in Western Australia:
 Ptilotus actinocladus T.Hammer & R.W.Davis, Priority 1
 Ptilotus alexandri Benl, Priority 2
 Ptilotus andersonii R.W.Davis, Priority 1
 Ptilotus beardii Benl, Priority 3
 Ptilotus blackii Benl, Priority 3
 Ptilotus caespitulosus F.Muell., Presumed Extinct
 Ptilotus chortophytus (Diels) Schinz, Priority 1
 Ptilotus chrysocomus R.W.Davis, Priority 1
 Ptilotus clivicola R.W.Davis & T.Hammer, Priority 2
 Ptilotus crispus Benl, Priority 1
 Ptilotus crosslandii (F.Muell.) Benl, Priority 3
 Ptilotus daphne Lally, Priority 1
 Ptilotus falcatus R.W.Davis & T.Hammer, Priority 1
 Ptilotus fasciculatus W.Fitzg., Priority 4
 Ptilotus lazaridis Benl, Priority 3
 Ptilotus luteolus (Benl & H.Eichler) R.W.Davis, Priority 3
 Ptilotus marduguru Benl, Priority 2
 Ptilotus mitchellii Benl, Priority 1
 Ptilotus mollis Benl, Priority 4
 Ptilotus procumbens Benl, Priority 1 
 Ptilotus pyramidatus (Moq.) F.Muell., Threatened (Declared Rare)
 Ptilotus rigidus Lally, Priority 1
 Ptilotus sericostachyus subsp. roseus (Moq.) Benl, Priority 1
 Ptilotus subspinescens R.W.Davis, Priority 3
 Ptilotus tetrandrus Benl, Priority 1
 Ptilotus trichocephalus Benl, Priority 4
 Ptilotus wilsonii Benl, Priority 1
 Ptilotus yapukaratja R.W.Davis & T.Hammer, Priority 1

Gallery

References

 
Amaranthaceae genera